The Babburkamme (also spelled Babbur Kamme, Bobburukamme, Babboor Kamme) are a community of Brahmins in India. They belong to Hindu Pancha Dravida Smartha Brahmin. They have been holding highly politically influencing position such ministers, chief priests, scholars and poets under different kingdoms.  A related community are today known as Uluchu Kamme has Kannada as their mother tongue.

Babburkammes are largely spread in the Karnataka towns of Bangalore, Mysore, Holenarasipura, Konanur, Arkalgud, Bellur, Kanakatte, Mirle, Arasikere, Belavadi, Mayasandra, Bettadapura, Davangere, Shivamogga, Chikkamagaluru, and Bhadravati.

History 
Their tradition is rooted in the pre-Buddhist Apastamba sutras, a kalpa vedanga and the oldest Dharmasutra of ancient India likely originating around the river Godavari.

Babburkammes are followers of the Smarta tradition, which is closely associated with the Advaita tradition of Adi Shankara. Kamme is derived from 'Karmin' (Karmigalu in Kannada) meaning those who practice "Vaidhika Dharma".

The migration pattern reflects the various Hindu kingdoms and economic centres of their times. Over the last 100 years, the local migration appears to be from small-towns to Mysore and Bangalore, and in recent years to other parts of the world. This trend seems to be coherent with migration patterns of other service-providing communities in the region.

Babburkammes place strong emphasis on education and political influence.

Due to their history, most in the community do not have significant ancestral land or other fixed assets (unlike the business or warrior communities, for example) and therefore formal education is seen as a pathway to success. In addition, and perhaps as a result of advanced education, the community is quite progressive in its outlook. 

The founder of the Vijayanaga Empire, Sri Vidyaranya, belonged to the community. It is also believed that he brought many Brahmins from his community to settle in Karnataka. Later, his brothers, Madhavacharya and Sayanacharya, contributed to Hinduism by documenting the Vedas and Upanishads for the first time (hitherto it was spread from guru to shishya by word-of-mouth).

Culture 
The mother tongue of majority Babburkamme Brahmins is Kannada. A minority claims Sanskrit as its mother tongue. They are vegetarians (no restriction to use milk, leather and horns).

Deities and festivals 
The main deity of Babburkammes is dependent on the family deity or Ishta-Deva. Those deities can be Shiva-Shakti or Laxmi-Narayan but, being followers of Advaita Smartism, Babburkammes worship all the major forms of God in Hinduism including Shiva, Vishnu, Ganesha, Gowri, Saraswati, Laxmi, Durga, and Karthikeya.

Babburkamme offer Panchayatana puja worship, introduced by Adi Shankara, and celebrate all the festivals of the Mysore region. They have Shaiva, Vaishnava and Shakta leanings.

References 

Kannada Brahmins
Social groups of Karnataka